Big Calibre is a 1935 American Western film produced by Supreme Pictures and directed by Robert N. Bradbury. It premiered on March 8, 1935. The film features Bob Steele as Bob O'Neill, a stockgrower who, seeking vengeance for his murdered father, goes after the murderer, crazed scientist Otto Zenz (Bill Quinn).

Plot
Rancher Bob O'Neill's father is gassed to death by lunatic Otto Zenz. In a bid to avenge his father, Bob tracks the scientist down, and they eventually have a showdown in the dry plains.

Cast

 Bob Steele as Bob O'Neill
 Peggy Campbell as June Bowers
 Forrest Taylor as Banker Bentley
 John Elliott as Rusty Hicks
 Georgia O'Dell as Arabella
 William Quinn as Otto Zenz, aka Gadski (credited as Bill Quinn)
 Earl Dwire as Sheriff of Gladstone
 Frank Ball as Jim Bowers
 Si Jenks as Square Dance Caller (credited as Cy Jenks)
 Chris Allen as Man at Dance (uncredited)
 Silver Tip Baker as Barfly / Man at Dance (uncredited)
 Barney Beasley as Barfly (uncredited)
 Frank Brownlee as Mr. Neal (uncredited)
 Dick Dickinson as Mail Guard (uncredited)
 Fern Emmett as Woman at Dance (uncredited)
 Jack Evans as Man at Dance (uncredited)
 Herman Hack as Deputy Buck (uncredited)
 Otto Hoffman as Man at Dance (uncredited)
 Jack Jones as Cowboy Who Shoots June off Horse (uncredited)
 William McCall as Sheriff #1 (uncredited)
 Frank McCarroll as Jim (uncredited)
 Art Mix as Man at Dance (uncredited)
 Perry Murdock as Deputy (uncredited)
 Fred Parker as Sheriff's Visitor (uncredited)
 James Sheridan as Barfly / Man at Dance (uncredited)
 Arthur Thalasso as Arthur Thalasso
 Blackie Whiteford as Man at Dance (uncredited)

Reception
Film critic Bob Magers considers Big Calibre to be one of Steele's finer films.

See also
 Bob Steele filmography

References

External links

1935 films
American Western (genre) films
Films directed by Robert N. Bradbury
1935 Western (genre) films
Mad scientist films
American black-and-white films
1930s American films
1930s English-language films